Hriday is an Indian masculine given name. Notable people with the name include:
Hriday Gattani (born 1991), Indian musical artist
Hriday Shetty, Indian film director
Hriday Nath Wanchoo, (died 1992), Kashmiri communist trade-unionist
Hriday Lani, Indian screenwriter

Indian masculine given names